III:  Beneath Trident's Tomb is the third and final album by the black metal band Twilight. It was released in 2014.

Track listing

Credits
N. Imperial - Vocals
Thurston Moore- Vocals, guitars
Stavros Giannopoulos - Vocals, guitars
Sanford Parker - Keyboards, effects
Wrest - Drums, bass, guitars

References

2014 albums